Joseph Marc Denis (born August 1, 1977) is a Canadian former professional ice hockey goaltender, who last played with the Montreal Canadiens of the National Hockey League (NHL). For the 2009–10 season, he was hired as the goaltenders' coach of the Chicoutimi Saguenéens, a Quebec Major Junior Hockey League (QMJHL) team. He is currently working as a colour analyst for the Francophone Canadian sports station, RDS. He is the all time leader in save percentage in the shootout among goaltenders who have faced at least 40 shootout attempts.

Playing career
As a youth, Denis played in the 1990 and 1991 Quebec International Pee-Wee Hockey Tournaments with a minor ice hockey team from Montreal.

Denis was drafted 25th overall by the Colorado Avalanche at the 1995 NHL Entry Draft.  Upon turning professional with Colorado, Denis mainly played for Colorado's American Hockey League (AHL) affiliate, the Hershey Bears, and played a total of 28 regular season games in three seasons for the Avalanche.  On June 7, 2000, Denis was traded to  the Columbus Blue Jackets for a second-round pick in the 2000 draft (used to choose Tomas Kurka). During the 2002–03 NHL season, he set the then-NHL record for most minutes in a season with 4,511, playing 77 regular season games that season.

On June 30, 2006, Denis was traded to the Tampa Bay Lightning for Fredrik Modin and Fredrik Norrena. In the 2007–08 season, on December 28, due to his sub-par and inconsistent play, the Lightning waived Denis. After he cleared waivers, Denis was sent down to the Lightning's AHL affiliate, the Norfolk Admirals. The Lightning later recalled Denis from Norfolk on March 26, 2008. Denis replaced goalie Jonathan Boutin, who was earlier recalled from the Admirals on an emergency basis because starting goalie Mike Smith had a sprained left ankle. After the season, Denis was bought out from the Lightning on June 25, 2008.

Denis, who therefore became a free agent, then signed a contract with his hometown team, the Montreal Canadiens, on July 3, 2008. After training camp, Marc Denis was assigned to Montreal's AHL affiliate, the Hamilton Bulldogs. Denis was recalled as an injury replacement for the Canadiens throughout the season and appeared in one game with the Canadiens when he relieved Jaroslav Halak for the third period in a 4–1 loss to the New Jersey Devils on January 2, 2009.

Career statistics

Regular season and playoffs

International

Awards and honours

References

External links

1977 births
Living people
Canadian ice hockey goaltenders
Chicoutimi Saguenéens (QMJHL) players
Colorado Avalanche players
Colorado Avalanche draft picks
Columbus Blue Jackets players
Hamilton Bulldogs (AHL) players
Hershey Bears players
Ice hockey people from Montreal
Montreal Canadiens announcers
Montreal Canadiens players
National Hockey League broadcasters
National Hockey League first-round draft picks
Norfolk Admirals players
Tampa Bay Lightning players